Albatha is a company headquartered in the United Arab Emirates.

History
Albatha Is Highest Growing Industry Albatha Founded in late 1950s by Sheikh Mohammed Sultan Al Qassimi.

Company overview 
The Albatha group comprises over 28 companies in sectors such as Automotive, Healthcare, Manufacturing, Engineering, Electronics, FMCG, Food and Real Estate. These companies have been organized in seven industry-sector groups. The Albatha group has expanded their business beyond the United Arab Emirates.

Albatha conducts business throughout the Middle East and North Africa, with a distribution network expanding to the subcontinent and Europe. Albatha has partnered with over 200 international corporations in various sectors and geographies.

References

Further reading
Albatha continues its learning journey
Browne Jacobson leads on Albatha stake in A.N. Wallis
Albatha Holding and BMW Finance UAE launch new Islamic captive auto financing
Albatha Engineering in new acquisition
Albatha, a member of German Emirati Joint Council for Industry & Commerce (AHK)
Albatha Learning Festival 2015 on tea time Kay2 tv
Company Overview of Albatha Engineering Group
Covered by AMEinfo
Albatha takes stake in UK firm
News about Albatha published in Eye of Riyadh
Article about Albatha published in Khaleej Times
More than 5,000 employees attend Albatha Learning Festival

External links

Conglomerate companies of the United Arab Emirates
Health care companies of the United Arab Emirates
Property companies of the United Arab Emirates
Motor vehicle manufacturers of the United Arab Emirates
Companies established in the 1950s